Cymindis mannerheimi is a species of ground beetle in the subfamily Harpalinae. It was described by Gebler in 1843.

References

mannerheimi
Beetles described in 1843